James D'Arcy-Evans (born 26 July 1935) is an International cricket umpire. He has umpired in 1 Women's Test match, 14 First-class matches and 3 List A matches.

References 

1935 births
Living people
Australian cricket umpires